Katrina A. Blouke Goddard is an American genetic epidemiologist and biostatistician specializing in public health genomics and the translation of genomic applications into clinical practice. Goddard is the director of the division of cancer control and population sciences (DCCPS) at the National Cancer Institute (NCI). She was previously the distinguished investigator and director of translational and applied genomics at the Kaiser Permanente Center for Health Research and a faculty member at Case Western Reserve University.

Education 
Goddard was born to Morley and Kay Blouke. She completed a B.S. in molecular biology at the University of Wisconsin–Madison in 1990. Goddard graduated with honors and was a member of Alpha Chi Sigma. She earned a M.S. (1995) and a Ph.D. (1999) in biostatistics at the University of Washington School of Public Health. Goddard's dissertation was titled Study Design Issues in the Analysis of Complex Genetic Traits.

Career 
Goddard is a genetic epidemiologist who focuses on public health genomics and the translation of genomic applications into clinical practice. From 1999 to 2007, Goddard was part of the faculty in the department of epidemiology and biostatistics at Case Western Reserve University. Goddard was a mid-career fellow at the Centers for Disease Control and Prevention in Genetics & Public Health Research and Practice from 2006 to 2007.

She directed or collaborated on over 25 federally funded research studies and has held numerous leadership positions on national research consortia. While at Kaiser Permanente, Goddard was the founding director for the NW Biobank, and she was a principal investigator (PI) of the Cancer Health Assessments Reaching Many (CHARM) study as part of the National Human Genome Research Institute (NHGRI)-funded Clinical Sequencing Evidence-Generating Research (CSER) consortium, which has an overarching goal of investigating the integration of genome-scale sequencing into clinical care for diverse and medically underserved individuals. Goddard was the site PI of the Kaiser Permanente Northwest partner site for the NCI-DCEG Connect for Cancer Prevention Study (Connect), a new prospective cohort seeking to enroll 200,000 adults in the United States from nine integrated health care systems and designed to further investigate the etiology of cancer and its outcomes.

In October 2021, Goddard was appointed director of the division of cancer control and population sciences (DCCPS) at the National Cancer Institute (NCI). In this position, she oversees a division that covers a wide range of scientific domains and disciplines, including epidemiology, behavioral science, surveillance and statistics, cancer survivorship, and health services and outcomes research.

References 

Living people
Year of birth missing (living people)
Place of birth missing (living people)
21st-century American women scientists
American women epidemiologists
American epidemiologists
Biostatisticians
21st-century American mathematicians
American women statisticians
21st-century women mathematicians
University of Wisconsin–Madison alumni
University of Washington School of Public Health alumni
Case Western Reserve University faculty
National Institutes of Health people
Cancer researchers